Gregoria fenestrata is a species of sea anemone in the monotypic genus Gregoria.

References

Sagartiidae
Animals described in 1860
Taxa named by Philip Henry Gosse